

The OMA SUD Skycar is an Italian twin-engined five-seat piston-engined pusher configuration monoplane designed and built by OMA SUD SpA based in Capua.

Design and development
The Skycar is an unusual twin-engined pusher-configuration high-wing monoplane with twin vertical tails with a high-mounted single horizontal stabiliser.  The Lycoming IO-360-C1E6 piston engines are mounted on the trailing edge of each mainplane. The prototype first flew on 21 December 2007 and was first displayed in public at the 2009 Paris Air Show. The Skycar was issued with a European Aviation Safety Agency Type Certificate on 8 January 2010. The Skycar was designed for both the General Aviation market and military market.

The Skycar was issued FAA Type Certificate A63CE on 14 March 2011.

Specifications

References

External links

Photograph of a Skycar in flight

2000s Italian civil utility aircraft
Twin-engined pusher aircraft
High-wing aircraft
Aircraft first flown in 2007